The 1937–38 Duquesne Dukes men's ice hockey season was the inaugural season of play for the program.

Season
With the backing of Al Sutphin, owner of the Cleveland Arena, and John Harris, owner of the Duquesne Gardens, Duquesne was a founding member of the Penn-Ohio Intercollegiate Hockey League. With Father Louis A. Deitrich heading the new program, a roster was assembled mostly from the previous year's championship club team. The team's first scheduled game was cancelled when the University of Akron wasn't able to continue with the league. Instead, the team played its first game against Pittsburgh on December 14. The game was attended by about 1,000 fans and saw Duquesne win their first ever varsity hockey game.

Duquesne didn't play for several weeks afterwards due to the Christmas break, but they returned with a second victory, this time over Carnegie Tech in mid-January. The team got a wake-up call in early February when they lost consecutive games and dropped to 2nd in their division. Since Pitt was also a very strong team that season, the Dukes couldn't afford too many losses if they wanted a division crown. They responded with an inspired brand of hockey and won their final 7 games of the regular season. In that time, Duquesne provided the biggest upset of the Penn-Ohio League by defeating John Carroll who, until that point, had been undefeated. 

In the program's first playoff game, Duquesne fought a close affair with Pittsburgh but were able to triumph 1–0 over the Panthers. Because the league had decided on a two-game total-goal series, the win didn't give the Dukes much of a cushion and they couldn't afford to lost the second game. Unfortunately, Pitt rallied and a hat-trick from Bob Schooley gave the Panthers a 3–0 in and ended Duquesne's season on a sour note.

Roster

Standings

Schedule and Results

|-
!colspan=12 style=";" | Regular Season

|-
!colspan=12 style=";" | Penn-Ohio League Playoffs

|- align="center" bgcolor="#e0e0e0"
|colspan=12|Duquesne Lost Series 1–3

References

Duquesne Dukes men's ice hockey seasons
Duquesne
Duquesne
Duquesne
Duquesne